Mountain Ash may refer to:

Places 
 Mountain Ash, Rhondda Cynon Taf, a town in Wales
 Mountain Ash, Kentucky, a town in America
 Mountain Ash railway station, a railway station in Wales

Plants 
 Mountain-ash or rowan, several rose shrubs or trees in the genus Sorbus
 Australian mountain ash or stringy gum (Eucalyptus regnans), a forest tree